"You're the Inspiration" is a song written by Peter Cetera and David Foster for the group Chicago and recorded for their fourteenth studio album Chicago 17 (1984), with Cetera singing lead vocals. The third single released from that album, it reached  on the US Billboard Hot 100 chart in January 1985 and also climbed to the top position on the Adult Contemporary chart at the same time. The song won honors for Cetera from the American Society of Composers, Authors and Publishers (ASCAP), in 1986 in the most-performed songs category.

Peter Cetera re-recorded the song for his 1997 solo album You're the Inspiration: A Collection. That same year he also recorded a single version with the vocal R&B group Az Yet.

History
Peter Cetera stated in a 2004 interview that "You're the Inspiration" started out as a song for Kenny Rogers:
 Cetera then changed some of the words and recorded the song with Chicago for their Chicago 17 album.

Reception
Billboard said that it was "somewhere between a hymn and an anthem."

Personnel
Peter Cetera – lead and background vocals, arrangements
Bill Champlin – guitars, keyboards, background vocals
Robert Lamm – keyboards, background vocals
Lee Loughnane – synth bass
James Pankow – keyboards
Walter Parazaider – guitar
Chris Pinnick – guitar

Additional personnel
Carlos Vega – drums
Michael Landau – guitar
Paul Jackson Jr. – guitar
Mark Goldenberg – guitar
Paulinho da Costa – percussion
David Foster – keyboards, synth programming, synth bass (Moog), additional arrangements
John Van Tongeren – synthesizer programming
Erich Bulling – synthesizer programming
Marcus Ryle – synthesizer programming
Gary Grant – trumpet
Greg Adams – trumpet
Kenny Cetera – background vocals
David Foster and Jeremy Lubbock – orchestration

Music video
The video depicted the band performing intercut with scenes of embracing couples of varying ages ranging from young kids to a couple resembling Billy Idol and Madonna at the time. Lead singer Peter Cetera is seen wearing a T-shirt from the British goth band Bauhaus. During his performance, Cetera is sitting the whole time. It also uses an alternate version of the song without the guitar sting between the second and third choruses.

Charts

Weekly charts

Year-end charts

Peter Cetera feat. Az Yet version

In 1997, Peter Cetera re-recorded "You're the Inspiration" for his 1997 solo album You're the Inspiration: A Collection. Due to Cetera featuring on R&B vocal group Az Yet's cover of "Hard to Say I'm Sorry" earlier in the year, they collaborated on a remix of Cetera's solo recording of "You're the Inspiration", which was released as a single. This version reached No. 77 on the Billboard Hot 100 and No. 29 on the Adult Contemporary chart. Like Az Yet's "Hard to Say I'm Sorry", Cetera and Az Yet's version of "You're the Inspiration" was also produced by Babyface.

Music video
The music video for Peter Cetera and Az Yet's "You're the Inspiration" was directed by Steven R. Monroe and was filmed at Westward Beach (Malibu, California).

Track listings
 "You're the Inspiration" – 4:07
 "Hard to Say I'm Sorry" – 3:13

Charts

See also
List of number-one adult contemporary singles of 1985 (U.S.)

References

External links
 

1984 songs
1984 singles
1997 singles
Chicago (band) songs
Peter Cetera songs
Az Yet songs
Songs written by David Foster
Songs written by Peter Cetera
Song recordings produced by David Foster
Song recordings produced by Babyface (musician)
Warner Records singles
Full Moon Records singles
Rock ballads
1980s ballads